Gabriel Antero Pinillo (born September 3, 1982) is a Colombian footballer. He last played for C.D. Águila in El Salvador.

External links
http://www.elgrafico.com/aguila/player/7/335.html
http://www.soccerway.mobi/page.php?sport=soccer&language_id=en&page=player&id=135238
http://www.bdfa.com.ar/jugadores-GABRIEL-ANTERO-37095.html

1982 births
Living people
People from Jamundí
Colombian footballers
Real Cartagena footballers
América de Cali footballers
Deportes Tolima footballers
Deportivo Pereira footballers
Bogotá FC footballers
Atlético F.C. footballers
Deportivo Pasto footballers
C.D. Águila footballers
Yaracuyanos FC players
Categoría Primera A players
Colombian expatriate footballers
Expatriate footballers in El Salvador
Association football forwards
Sportspeople from Valle del Cauca Department